Elaenia is a genus of  passerine birds in the tyrant flycatcher family which occur in Mexico, the Caribbean, and Central and South America. Except by voice, specific identification is often difficult since many species are very similar. They are also known by the common name elaenia, which they share with the similar tyrant flycatchers of the genus Myiopagis.

Elaenia flycatchers are typically brownish, greyish or olive above, and off-white and/or pale yellow on the belly, with a white or pale yellowish eye-ring of variable strength and two or three wing bars. Some species show a crest; often with a semi-concealed white patch/streak.

Taxonomy
The genus Elaenia was introduced by the Swedish zoologist Carl Jakob Sundevall in 1836. The type species was subsequently designated as the yellow-bellied elaenia. The name of the genus is from the Ancient Greek ελαινεος elaineos "of olive-oil" or "oleaginous".

The genus contains 22 species:

See also
Myiopagis, another genus of tyrant flycatchers commonly known as elaenias

References

Hilty, Steven L. (2003): Birds of Venezuela. Christopher Helm, London. 
Stiles, F. Gary & Skutch, Alexander Frank (1989): A guide to the birds of Costa Rica. Comistock, Ithaca. 

 
Bird genera
Higher-level bird taxa restricted to the Neotropics